Silver Lining is a Big Finish Productions audio drama featuring Lisa Bowerman as Bernice Summerfield, a character from the spin-off media based on the long-running British science fiction television series Doctor Who. Silver Lining was given away free with Doctor Who Magazine #351. Although a stand-alone adventure, Silver Lining theoretically fits into Season 5 of the Bernice Summerfield adventures from Big Finish Productions. Silver Lining occupies the fourteenth to twenty-first tracks of the CD, the first thirteen being occupied by UNIT: The Coup, and the twenty-second to thirty-third occupied by promotions for various Big Finish Productions Doctor Who and Bernice Summerfield audio plays.

Plot 
(From the CD sleeve) Bernice is asked to investigate the remains of an ancient civilisation on Tysir IV. As she digs deeper into the mystery, she discovers that Tysir IV is not quite as dead as she'd been told.

Cast
Bernice Summerfield - Lisa Bowerman
Lynton - Nicholas Briggs
The Cyberman - Nicholas Briggs

References

External links
 Silver Lining - at Tardis Data Core, a specialist Doctor Who wiki

Silver Lining
Cybermen audio plays
Fiction set in the 27th century